The Yugoslav Radical Union (Serbian: Jugoslovenska radikalna zajednica, Југословенска радикална заједница; , Croatian: Jugoslavenska radikalna zajednica; or JRZ) was the ruling far-right party of Yugoslavia from 1934 until the 1941 coup d'état.

The party, whose agenda was based on fascism, was the dominant political movement in the country until 1939, when Milan Stojadinović was removed as prime minister. Party members wore green shirt uniforms and šajkača caps, and they addressed Stojadinović as Vođa 'Leader'.

The party also had a paramilitary wing called the Greenshirts, who assaulted and clashed with those who were against Stojadinović's rule. Stojadinović told Italian foreign minister Galeazzo Ciano that, although the party had initially been established as a moderate authoritarian movement, his intention was to model the party after the Italian National Fascist Party.

Milan Stojadinović led the party until 1939 when his second cabinet collapsed due to his pro-Axis policy. He was replaced by Dragiša Cvetković as prime minister and de jure party leader. The party practically ceased to exist with the formation of the Cvetković–Maček government in 1939, although JRZ was not formally abolished or dissolved.

See also
Organization of Yugoslav Nationalists (ORJUNA)
Yugoslav National Movement (ZBOR)

References

Notes

Political parties established in 1935
Political parties in the Kingdom of Yugoslavia
Yugoslavism
Political parties disestablished in 1941
1935 establishments in Serbia
Radical parties
Fascist parties
Clothing in politics
Far-right political parties
1941 disestablishments in Yugoslavia